E 003 is a European B class road in Turkmenistan and Uzbekistan, connecting the cities Uchkuduk – Daşoguz – Ashgabat – Gaudan. This route is not signposted in any form.

Route 

Uchkuduk

Daşoguz
Ashgabat
 Gaudan

References

External links 
 UN Economic Commission for Europe: Overall Map of E-road Network (2007)

International E-road network
Roads in Turkmenistan